Martisco station, also known as Martisco Station Railway Museum, is a railroad station in Martisco, Onondaga County, New York. It was built in 1870 by the Auburn and Syracuse Railroad, and is a two-story, Italianate style brick building.  Decorative brackets support an unusually long overhang of the roof. The line and station were eventually acquired by the New York Central Railroad. The station is owned by the Central New York Chapter of the National Railway Historical Society, and is open as a museum during limited hours in the summer.  Adjacent to the station is a contributing Pennsylvania Railroad dining car.

It was listed on the National Register of Historic Places in 2007 as Martisco Station.

References

External links

Martisco Station Railway Museum - Town of Camillus information

Railroad museums in New York (state)
Railway stations on the National Register of Historic Places in New York (state)
Historic American Buildings Survey in New York (state)
Italianate architecture in New York (state)
Railway stations in the United States opened in 1870
Museums in Onondaga County, New York
Former New York Central Railroad stations
National Register of Historic Places in Onondaga County, New York
Former railway stations in New York (state)